Jjokbari (borrowed into Japanese as , romaji choppari) is a Korean language ethnic slur which may refer to Japanese citizens or people of Japanese ancestry. 

According to one survey, it was Korea's second-most commonly used slur against Japanese people, ahead of wae-nom and behind ilbon-nom.

Origin 

The original meaning is "A cloven foot". Jjok means a "piece" and bal means "feet" in Korean, and when combined it roughly translates to "split feet" or "cloven hoof". This etymology refers to the fact that the Japanese wore geta, a traditional Japanese wooden sandal, which separates the big toe from the others. 

Unlike Korean-style straw shoes which completely cover the foot, Japanese-style straw shoes and wooden geta consist of only a sole and straps to bind it to the sole of the foot. This leaves the rest of the foot exposed, including the "split" between the toes. Koreans thought of Japanese shoes as incomplete compared to their own, and the visible split as a distinctive enough trait to inspire an ethnic slur.

In Japan 
The term has also been borrowed into Japanese language spoken by ethnic Koreans in Japan, where it is rendered Choppari. The form ban-jjokbari (literally, "half  jjokbari") originated as a derogatory reference to Japanized Koreans during the Japanese colonial period in Korea; later, it came to be used by Koreans to refer to Japanese with Korean ancestry. The Japanized pronunciation of this form, ban-choppari, is also widely used by Koreans in Japan, either to refer to Japanized Koreans or to people with both Japanese and Korean ancestry.

See also 
Anti-Japanese sentiment 
Anti-Japanese sentiment in Korea
Guizi (Chinese)
Jap (English)
Xiao Riben (Chinese)
Zainichi Korean language

References 

Ethnic and religious slurs
Korean words and phrases
Anti-Japanese sentiment in Korea
Zainichi Korean culture